Liptaň is a municipality and village in Bruntál District in the Moravian-Silesian Region of the Czech Republic. It has about 500 inhabitants.

Administrative parts
Villages of Bučávka and Horní Povelice are administrative parts of Liptaň.

Geography
Liptaň is situated in the Osoblažsko microregion. It lies in the Zlatohorská Highlands.

South of the village of Liptaň is situated the natural monument Liptaňský bludný balvan with one of the largest glacial erratics in the Czech Republic. Reminding of the period 250–800 thousand years ago, the boulder was carried there by a continental glacier from the south of Sweden. Its weight is about 4.7 tonnes.

History
The first written mention of Liptaň is from 1256. It was founded around 1240. For most of its history, it was a fief of the Olomouc bishopric or it was administered directly by the Olomouc bishops.

The event known as the Liptaň Tragedy happened on 22 September 1938. Radicalized German villagers attacked the gendarmerie station and disarmed and assassinated all six Czech members of the State Defense Guard. The gendarme officers' bodies were transported over the border to the German town Leobschütz where they were buried in an unmarked mass grave.

Transport
Liptaň lies on the narrow-gauge Třemešná ve Slezsku – Osoblaha Railway.

Sport

Sights
The landmark of the village is the parish Church of the Assumption of the Virgin Mary. The original church was as old as the village. The current building was built of red bricks in the Neo-Gothic style in 1866–1870.

Other historical monuments include the Chapel of Our Lady of Help, the house No. 240 with a chapel, and the former police station in the house No. 261 where the Liptaň Tragedy took place. There is a memorial plaque commemorating this event.

On the top of Strážnice hill there is a wooden observation tower.

The narrow-gauge railway serves not only for transport but also as a tourist attraction. Steam trains run on weekends during the tourist season.

References

External links

Villages in Bruntál District